There are at least 9 named mountains in Golden Valley County, Montana.
 Antelope Butte, el. 
 Chinamans Hat, el. 
 Haystack Butte, el. 
 Lost Peak, el. 
 Mount Sinai, el. 
 O'Brien Hill, el. 
 Red Hill, el. 
 Sahara Hill, el. 
 Tepee Point, el.

See also
 List of mountains in Montana
 List of mountain ranges in Montana

Notes

Landforms of Golden Valley County, Montana
Golden Valley